Slumber of Sullen Eyes is the debut album by the Finnish death metal band Demigod. The album was released in 1992 on the Drowned Productions label. It was out of print for years but has been re-released worldwide by Xtreem Music in 2006. This remastered 2006 version includes the 1991 demo Unholy Domain as a bonus. The colour scheme of the artwork is somewhat different on the re-release, emphasizing copper and dark brown instead of the red-green-black of the original. As even the re-release CD had become hard to get, it was repressed in 2009.

Track listing
  "Apocryphal (Intro)"   – 0:22  
  "As I Behold I Despise"  – 4:38  
  "Dead Soul"  – 3:43  
  "The Forlorn"  – 4:04  
  "Tears of God"  – 5:14  
  "Slumber of Sullen Eyes"  – 5:58  
  "Embrace the Darkness / Blood of the Perished"  – 5:04  
  "Fear Obscures from Within"  – 4:18  
  "Transmigration beyond Eternities"  – 4:29  
  "Towards the Shrouded Infinity"  – 3:39  
  "Perpetual Ascent"  – 3:45  
  "Darkened"  – 2:48  (Bonus)

Personnel
Esa Linden: Vocals
Jussi Kiiski: Guitars
Mika Haapasalo: Guitars
Tero Laitinen: Bass
Seppo Taatila: Keyboards, Drums, Percussion

References

1992 debut albums
Demigod (band) albums